Walkomiella is an extinct conifer-like gymnosperm genus which occurred in India and Africa in the Lower Permian, and in Australia in the Upper Permian.

It was named for Arthur Bache Walkom, an Australian palaeobotanist.

References

Conifer genera
Prehistoric gymnosperm genera
Permian plants